Wonje() is a Korean monk, essayist, and travel writer.

Life
After graduating from the Department of Religious Studies at Sogang University in 2006, he was ordained as the 40th disciple of the Buddhist monk Beopjeon. In addition to being impressed with the Buddha's 'authenticity' by looking at the early scriptures of the Gautama Buddha, his meditation experience led him to become a monk. He has traveled to 45 countries on 5 continents for 2 years from September 2012, and published 《If the question stops, it becomes the answer by itself》 in 2019. He is currently practicing in Gimcheon Monastery and publishing articles through SNS.

Book
 《If the question stops, it becomes the answer by itself》

References

External links 

 
 
 

South Korean Buddhist monks
Sogang University alumni
South Korean essayists